The 1991 Irish Greyhound Derby took place during August and September with the final being held at Shelbourne Park in Dublin on 14 September 1991.

The winner Ardfert Mick (named after Ardfert local Mike Mulrennan) won £30,000 and was trained by Matt O'Donnell, owned by Noel Clifford and bred by Maurice Harty. The race was sponsored by the Kerry Group's dog food product 'Respond'.

Final result 
At Shelbourne, 14 September (over 550 yards):

Distances 
2, 3¼, short-head, 1¾, dnf (lengths)

Quarter finals

Semi finals

Competition Report 
Matt O'Donnell entered eleven runners in an attempt to successfully defend the Respond Irish Derby title. All twelve safely negotiated the qualifying round. Among them was Farloe Melody and Ardfert Mick the winner of the Cox Cup at Newbridge Greyhound Stadium and Febo Champion Stakes, he had posted a new track record in the Cox Cup recording 28.68.

The fastest qualifier was Tipperary Cup champion Coalbrook Tiger in 30.13, followed by the John Coleman trained £10,000 Tennents Extra champion Satharn Lady in 30.17. Terrydrum Tico, Ardfert Mick and Coalbrook Tiger all successfully won their second round heats but Satharn Lady suffered a serious injury.

The quarter finals winners were Coalbrook Tiger (30.29), Farloe Melody (30.38), Terrydrum Tico (30.40), Mathews Gold (30.45), Early Potter (30.45) and Ask Clare (30.46). The first semi-final saw Farloe Melody defeat kennelmate Ardfert Mick before Super Gem provided a shock with a success over Coalbrook Tiger. Ask Clare beat the main English challenger Lyons Monk in the final heat.

Both Coalbrook Tiger and Farloe Melody made a hash of the start when the traps lifted, leaving Ask Clare in the lead pursued by his brother Ardfert Mick. Ardfert Mick took a first bend lead and drew clear. Coalbrook Tiger was knocked over and broke a hock. The win gave Matt O'Donnell two titles in a row and it was the first time that two full litter greyhounds had taken the first two places.

See also 
 1992 UK & Ireland Greyhound Racing Year

References 

Greyhound Derby
Irish Greyhound Derby